Anton Kalinitschenko (born 22 July 1982) is a Russian ski jumper. He competed in the large hill event at the 2002 Winter Olympics.

References

References
 

1982 births
Living people
Russian male ski jumpers
People from Kemerovo
Sportspeople from Kemerovo Oblast
Olympic ski jumpers of Russia
Ski jumpers at the 2002 Winter Olympics